The Earth and Man National Museum (romanized Natsionalen muzey „Zemyata i horata“) is a mineralogical museum in the centre of Sofia, the capital of Bulgaria.

It's one of the biggest mineralogical museums in the world. It was founded on 30 December 1985 and opened for visitors on 19 June 1987. The museum is situated in a reconstructed and adapted historic building with an area of 4,000 m² (43056 square feet) constructed in the end of the 19th century (1896–1898). It has a number of exhibition halls, stock premises, laboratories, a video room and a conference room. Its collection covers 40% of all known naturally occurring minerals as well as man-made ceramics prepared by Bulgarian scientists.

Apart from its permanent expositions related to mineral diversity, the museum also often hosts exhibitions connected with various other topics as well as concerts of chamber music.

Gallery

External links
 Official website (in Bulgarian and English)

Buildings and structures completed in 1898
Museums in Sofia
National museums of Bulgaria
Museums established in 1985
Geology museums
Natural history museums in Bulgaria
Science museums in Bulgaria
1985 establishments in Bulgaria